in F minor,  383, is a musical setting of the Stabat Mater sequence, composed by Franz Schubert in 1816. It is scored for soprano, tenor and bass soloists, SATB choir, 2 flutes, 2 oboes, 2 bassoons, contrabassoon, 2 french horns, 3 trombones, violin I and II, viola, cello and double bass.

The work is sometimes referred to as the Deutsches Stabat Mater, and was written for the composer's brother Ferdinand.

Schubert had written a shorter setting of the Latin  in 1815, Stabat Mater in G minor,  175, a single-movement piece of approximately six minutes' duration, using only four verses of the twenty stanzas of the sequence.

Structure

This setting is essentially a short oratorio with arias, duets, trios and chorus work. The work is divided into twelve movements. Performances require 30–40 minutes.

"" Largo, F minor, common time; choir
"" B-flat minor, 3/8; soprano
"" Andante, E-flat major, cut common time; choir
The recurring theme in the original version is based on the Kaiser Hymn. Schubert revised this later, believing it to be inappropriate. 
It is unknown if the allusion to the hymn was a patriotic gesture, or an homage to Haydn.
"" Allegretto, B-flat major, 2/4; soprano and tenor duet
"" Larghetto, G minor ending in G major, 3/4; chorus (divisi)
"" Adagio, C minor, common time; tenor
"" C major, common time; chorus
Schubert authorised cuts in this movement from bars 19–46, and bars 65–71.
"" Andantino, G major, 3/8; bass
"" Maestoso, E major, cut common time; chorus
"" Allegretto moderato, A major, common time; trio
— ""... Più mosso, A minor, common time
"" Andante sostenuto, F major, 3/4; trio and choir
"Amen" Allegro maestoso, F major, cut common time; chorus
Schubert authorised a cut in this movement from bars 101-115.

References

Further reading
 Programme notes for a concert by Cambridge choir "The Spectrum Singers", containing the text and English translation of Klopstock's Jesus Christus schwebt am Kreuze.

External links
 
 

S
1816 compositions
Church music by Franz Schubert
Compositions in F minor